was a Japanese businessman, central banker and the 3rd Governor of the Bank of Japan (BOJ). He was created a Baron; and he was a member of Japan's House of Peers.

Early life
Kawada was born in Kōchi Prefecture.

Career
Kawada's career was closely associated with Iwasaki Yatarō, the founder of Mitsubishi; and he was a key figure in the development of Mitsubishi's management structure.  He also played a key role in the early years of Nippon Yusen (NYK).

Kawada was Governor of the Bank of Japan from September 3, 1889 – November 7, 1896.

Notes

References
 Wray, William D. (1984). Mitsubishi and the N.Y.K., 1870-1914: Business Strategy in the Japanese Shipping Industry. Cambridge: Harvard University Press. ;  OCLC 10825248

1836 births
1896 deaths
Governors of the Bank of Japan
People from Kōchi Prefecture
Japanese bankers
Kazoku